Walter Ross may refer to:
Walter Ross (politician) (1817–1888), Canadian businessman and politician
Walter Ross (boxer) (1898–?), Scottish boxer
Walter John Macdonald Ross (1914–1982), British Army officer
Stubb Ross (died 1987), American entrepreneur

See also
Walter Ross-Taylor (1877–1958), Scottish politician and civil servant
Walter Ross Wade (1810–1862), American physician and planter